The 2016 Cheltenham Gold Cup (known as the Timico Gold Cup for sponsorship reasons) was the 88th annual running of the Cheltenham Gold Cup horse race and was held at Cheltenham Racecourse on Friday 18 March 2016.

The race was won by the 9 to 4 favourite, Don Cossack, owned by Ryanair CEO Michael O'Leary's Gigginstown House Stud, trained by Gordon Elliott in Ireland, and ridden by Bryan Cooper. The race gave Elliott and Cooper a first victory in the Cheltenham Gold Cup. Don Cossack won by 4½ lengths from Djakadam, with Don Poli a further 10 lengths behind in third place. All three placed horses were trained in Ireland.

Details
 Sponsor: Timico
 Winner's prize money: £327,462.00
 Going: Good.
 Number of runners: 9
 Winner's time: 6 mins 35.00 secs

Result

 Amateur jockeys indicated by "Mr".
* The distances between the horses are shown in lengths or shorter. shd = short-head.† Trainers are based in Great Britain unless indicated. PU = pulled-up. NR = non runner

References 

Cheltenham Gold Cup
 2016
Cheltenham Gold Cup
2010s in Gloucestershire
Cheltenham Gold Cup